Valentina Limani (born 2 February 1997) is a Kosovan professional footballer who plays as a forward for German club Eintracht Frankfurt III and the Kosovo national team.

Club career

1. FFC Frankfurt/Eintracht Frankfurt

Early career and period at second team
Limani was born in Komogllavë, and raised in Germany in a family of footballers where her younger brother, Gentrit is footballer and one of the most important players in Kosovo national youth teams. She at the age of twelve started playing football in 1. FFC Frankfurt. On 8 September 2013, Limani made her senior debut with 1. FFC Frankfurt II in a 0–2 home defeat against TSV Crailsheim after coming on as a substitute at 46th minute in place of Larissa Gördel.

Promotion to the first team
On 10 July 2014, Limani was promoted and included in the list of first team players competing in the Bundesliga. On 14 December 2014, she made her debut in a 0–4 away win against MSV Duisburg after coming on as a substitute at 87th minute in place of Verónica Boquete.

Short retirement and return as part of the third team
On 4 November 2020, Limani confirmed through an interview that she has retired due to schooling and in football is expected to return as coach. On 2 July 2021, Limani returned from retirement and joined Regionalliga side Eintracht Frankfurt III. On 12 September 2021, she made her debut in a 4–2 home win against SV Gläserzell after being named in the starting line-up.

International career

First period
On 27 February 2017, Limani was named as part of the Kosovo squad for 2017 Turkish Women's Cup. On 1 March 2017, she made her debut with Kosovo in 2017 Turkish Women's Cup group stage match against Poland after being named in the starting line-up. On 26 November 2017, Limani scored her first goal for Kosovo in her seventh appearance for the country in a 3–2 home minimal win over Montenegro. Her last international match was on 10 March 2020 against Slovenia in Pristina.

Second period

On 14 February 2021, Limani upon return from retirement received a call-up from Kosovo for the 2023 FIFA Women's World Cup qualification matches against Albania and Norway. Two days later, she made her first match with Kosovo after return from retirement in 2023 FIFA Women's World Cup qualification match against Albania after coming on as a substitute at 46th minute in place of Blerta Smaili and scored his side's only goal during a 1–1 away draw.

Career statistics

Club

International

International goals
Scores and results list Kosovo's goal tally first.

|-
|1.
|26 November 2017
|Adem Jashari Olympic Stadium, Mitrovica, Kosovo
|
|align="center"|1–1
|align="center"|3–2
|align="center" rowspan="2"|Friendly
|align="center"|
|-
|2.
|5 April 2019
|Gjakova City Stadium, Gjakova, Kosovo
|
|align="center"|2–0
|align="center"|3–1
|align="center"|
|-
|3.
|16 September 2021
|Elbasan Arena, Elbasan, Albania
|
|align="center"|1–1
|align="center"|1–1
|align="center"|2023 FIFA World Cup qualification
|align="center"|
|}

References

External links

1997 births
Living people
Place of birth missing (living people)
Kosovan women's footballers
Kosovo women's international footballers
Kosovan women's expatriate footballers
Kosovan expatriate sportspeople in Germany
German women's footballers
German people of Kosovan descent
German people of Albanian descent
Women's association football forwards
Frauen-Bundesliga players
1. FFC Frankfurt players
Eintracht Frankfurt (women) players